Hilton Manchester Deansgate is a hotel in Manchester city centre, England.

From 2006 to 2018, the skyscraper was the tallest building in Greater Manchester and outside London in the United Kingdom.

Occupancy
The four-star Hilton hotel occupies floors 1 to 22 and contains 279 bedrooms. The hotel has a four-storey annex, containing a swimming pool, ballroom, conference rooms and a coffee shop.

The 23rd floor has a  cantilevered overhang with two glass windows in its floor, overlooking the ground from the skybar, Cloud 23. It ranks among the world's best bars but only has capacity for 250 people. The bar's most popular cocktail is Mr. Mercer's Cotton Peculiar. Invented by Lancashire chemist John Mercer (1791 1866), mercerisation, the treating of cotton with caustic soda to give it a smooth silken sheen, is a process still used today.

Ian Simpson, the architect of the building (described as "the UK's first proper skyscraper outside London"), bought the top two floors – the 48th and 49th.

References

Manchester
Hotels in Manchester
Skyscrapers in Manchester
Skyscraper hotels in England